Kranjci refers to the following places in Croatia:

 Kranjci, Istria County
 Kranjci, Primorje-Gorski Kotar County